The knucklehead is a retronym used by enthusiasts to refer to a Harley-Davidson motorcycle engine, so named because of the distinct shape of the rocker boxes. The engine is a two-cylinder, 45 degree, pushrod actuated overhead valve V-twin engine with two valves per cylinder. It was the third basic type of V-Twin engine used by Harley-Davidson, replacing the Flathead-engined VL model in 1936 as HD's top-of-the-line model. The engine was manufactured until 1947 and was replaced by the Panhead engine in 1948. The Knucklehead-engined models were originally referred to as "OHVs" by enthusiasts of the time and in Harley's official literature; the nickname arose from the California chopper culture of the late 1960s.

As the design of Harley-Davidson engines has evolved through the years, the distinctive shape of the valve covers has allowed Harley enthusiasts to classify an engine simply by looking at the shape of the cover. The knucklehead engine valve covers have contours resembling knuckles on a person's fist that give the knucklehead its name.

See also
Harley-Davidson engine timeline

References

External links
 Images of each style of Harley-Davidson engine

Knucklehead